The giga was a type of bowed lyre, it was very popular especially in Norway, but also common to find in England, Iceland and Denmark. It is considered to be extinct; however there are some interesting reconstruction projects. The name does not originate from Latin, but rather derives from an old Viking word that meaning for "to vibrate", "to move in a fast way": this term is also the origin for the name of the dance called Jig that is very common in Northern Europe, especially in the British isles.

Sources
Otto Emanuel Andersson. The Shetland Gue, the Welsh Crwth, and the Northern Bowed Harp. Offprint from the Budkavlen 1954, nos. 1–4. Åbo: s.n., 1956

See also 
Ģīga

References

Bowed lyres
Norwegian musical instruments
Danish musical instruments
Lost and extinct musical instruments
Icelandic musical instruments
English musical instruments